Dorsum Guettard is a wrinkle-ridge at  in Mare Cognitum on the Moon. It is 40 km long and was named after French geologist and mineralogist Jean-Étienne Guettard in 1976.

References

External links
Dorsum Guettard at The Moon Wiki

Guettard